Eupithecia scoriodes is a moth of the family Geometridae. It was first described by Edward Meyrick in 1899. It is endemic to the Hawaiian island of Maui.

It is a dark, nearly black species. It is similar to Eupithecia phaeocausta, but the markings are much more definite.

References

External links

scoriodes
Endemic moths of Hawaii
Moths described in 1899